Heterotheca marginata, the Sonora false goldenaster, is a rare North American species of flowering plant in the family Asteraceae. It grows in Arizona in the southwestern United States. It has been found in only three counties in the south-central part of the state: Maricopa, Pinal, and Gila.

References

External links
Photo of herbarium specimen at Missouri Botanical Garden, collected in Maricopa County in 1993, isotype of Heterotheca marginata

marginata
Flora of Arizona
Plants described in 1996
Taxa named by John Cameron Semple